LELO is a Swedish company that designs and sells upmarket sex toys. Products are massed produced in Suzhou Industrial Park, China. 

Lelo may also refer to:
 Lelo (newspaper), a Georgian language sports newspaper
 Lelo, a style of Georgian wine
 Lelo, a try in the game of rugby union
 Lelo burti, literally "field ball", a Georgian sport similar to rugby union
 Lelo Saracens, a Georgian rugby union club
 Lelo for Georgia, a Georgian political party